Belmore is a suburb of Sydney, in the state of New South Wales, Australia. Belmore is located 11 kilometres south-west of the Sydney central business district, in the local government area of the City of Canterbury-Bankstown.

History
Belmore is named after the fourth Earl of Belmore, Governor of New South Wales from 1868 to 1872. The area was known as Darkwater in its early days. Francis Wild and John Sullivan were each granted  in 1823. The area was originally used for market gardens and orchards. Subdivision started after the railway came through in 1895.

The first school, Belmore South Primary School opened on 25 April 1892 and the post office opened in 1907. The town centre began developing in the 1920s and features some classic examples of art-deco architecture.

Heritage listings 
Belmore has a number of heritage-listed sites, including:
 Burwood Road: Belmore railway station
 32-36 Redman Parade: Community facilities
 481 Burwood Road: Doctor's surgery
 543 Burwood Road: Electricity Substation No. 274
 5 Knox Street: Electricity Substation No. 276
 35 Isabel Street: Federation and Inter War House
 37-37A Isabel Street: Federation and Inter War House
 39 Isabel Street: Federation and Inter War House
 2 Wilson Avenue: Federation Bakery, White House Bakery
 436 Burwood Road: Federation detached house Station Master's house
 37 Wilson Avenue: Federation House
 52 Albert Street: Federation House
 43 Wilson Avenue: Federation Weatherboard House
 370-372 Burwood Road: Inter War Building Post Office (former)
 35, 37 & 39 Isabel Street: Federation and Inter War House
 2, 4, 6, 8, 10, 12, 14, 16, 18 Lakemba Street: Californian Bungalows Inter War House
 103-105 Lakemba Street: Built in the 1920s
 12 Oxford Street: Victorian House
 31 Forsyth Street: Victorian Villa The Towers

Houses 
Belmore has a high percentage of period homes. It is predominantly a low-rise residential area full of well-maintained period family homes with large back-yards, wide tree-lined streets, and small parks and playgrounds. Art Deco shop façades dominate the small shopping strip. There are now an increasing number of high-rise units in the suburb mostly along Canterbury Road.

Pubs and Clubs

Canterbury Leagues Club
Located on 26 Bridge Rd, is an entertainment venue. The club dates back to 1957 to service the needs of the football club and local community. The club also amalgamated with Lakemba Services Memorial Club (2001) and the Moxon Sports Club.

St George Hotel
Located on 618 Canterbury Rd, is a heritage-listed landmark.

Commercial area
Belmore contains a mixture of residential, significant landmarks, commercial and industrial developments. The main commercial area is located along Burwood Road, near Belmore railway station. Commercial and industrial developments are also located along Canterbury Road and surrounding streets.

Transport
Belmore railway station is located on the Bankstown Line of the Sydney Trains network. The line was opened in 1895 and electrified in 1926. The station at Belmore opened on 1 February 1895. Belmore has many bus routes navigating to the south, to the north and the inner south west to the Sydney CBD.

Religious facilities 
Lien Hoa Temple, a Vietnamese Buddhist temple
 All Saints Greek Orthodox Church
 St Alban's Anglican Church
 St Joseph's Catholic Church
 Belmore Church of Christ
 Al-Azhar Mosque - Located @ 172B Burwood Rd, Belmore

Schools
 The Heritage Listed Belmore South Public School was officially opened on the 22 January 1917.
 Belmore Boys' High is a small, comprehensive, multicultural high school.
 St Joseph's Primary School is a coeducational K-6 primary school.
 All Saints Grammar School is a co-educational Orthodox Christian School from Pre-Kindergarten to Year 12, run under the auspices of the Greek Orthodox Archdiocese of Australia.

Gallery

Sport
Belmore Sports Ground is the home ground of the National Rugby League team Canterbury-Bankstown Bulldogs. It is the current home ground for New South Wales Premier League team Sydney Olympic. The "Back to Belmore" campaign was established in August 2005 to upgrade Belmore Sports Grounds as a top-class sporting facility to NRL standards for the Bulldogs to stage a select number of NRL games at their traditional home ground in the long-term future.

Demographics
According to the 2016 census of population, there were 12,718 residents in Belmore. 

 43.7% of residents were born in Australia, compared with the national average of 66.7%. The next most common countries of birth were Greece 6.3%, China 5.3%, Lebanon 4.1%, Vietnam 3.5% and South Korea 2.9%.

 27.7% of people only spoke English at home. Other languages spoken at home included Greek 14.1%, Arabic 12.8%, Mandarin 4.6%, Vietnamese 4.4% and Korean 3.6%.

 The most common responses for religious affiliation were Catholic 24.1%, Eastern Orthodox 17.8%, No Religion 14.3% and Islam 12.9%.
 The most common ancestries in Belmore were Greek 13.4%, Lebanese 9.5%, Chinese 8.7%, Australian 8.1% and English 8%.

References

External links

  [CC-By-SA]
 Back to Belmore - Back to the Future, Back to Basics

Suburbs of Sydney
City of Canterbury-Bankstown